Joseph M. Downes (died November 16, 1993) was the sixty fifth Mayor of Lowell, Massachusetts.

Downes graduated from Lowell High School in 1937.  Downes played baseball with the Boston Braves organization after his high school graduation.

During World War II Downes served in the Pacific on the USS Estes.

After World War II, beginning in 1946, Downes served for twenty years as a member of the Lowell police force.

References

1993 deaths
United States Navy personnel of World War II
Mayors of Lowell, Massachusetts
Lowell, Massachusetts City Council members
Year of birth missing
American police officers